Zultrax was  a multi-network peer-to-peer application. Supported networks are ZEPP and gnutella. Zultrax runs under the Microsoft Windows operating system.

Zultrax was originally developed in 2001 by Peter Bartholomeus but is now maintained by a team of developers under the name Zultrax V.O.F. It is coded using Borland Delphi, which is the reason a 64-bit version of the program hasn't been released.

The aim of Zultrax is to provide ease of use combined with the encrypted ZEPP network. This network is fully concentrated around the concepts of swarming and privacy protection.

References

External links 
 
 Review by Ian Harac for PC World
 Interview with Zultrax

Gnutella clients
Windows-only shareware